This is a list of four ancient peoples and their tribes that were possibly related and formed an extinct Indo-European branch of peoples and languages in the eastern Balcans, low Danube basin. These peoples dwelt from west of the Tyras (Dniester) river and east of the Carpathian Mountains in the north, to the north coast of the Aegean Sea in the south, from the west coast of the Pontus Euxinus (Black Sea) in the east, to roughly the Angrus (modern South Morava) river basin, Tisia (modern Tisza) and Danubius (modern Danube) rivers in the west. This list is based in the possible ethnolinguist affiliation of these peoples - Geto-Dacians, Moesians, Thracians and Paeonians (including possibly or partly Thracian or Dacian tribes) and not only on a geographical base (that includes other peoples that were not Dacians or Thracians like the Celts that lived in Dacia or in Thrace).

Ancestors

Proto-Indo-Europeans (Proto-Indo-European speakers)
Proto-Daco-Thracians (Proto-Daco-Thracian speakers)

Daco-Moesians

Geto-Dacians

Dacians / Daci (a closely related people to the Getae, mainly west of the Carpathian Mountains, roughly matching the Dacia Superior Roman Province)
Albocenses
Ansamenses
Apuli / Appuli / Apulenses (Dacian Apuli) with the center at Apulon
Biephi / Biephes
Bures / Buri (Northwest Buri), they lived in the northwest of Dacia - South of Slovakian Carpathians, in the Upper Basin of the Tisia / Tisza, although related, they were a different tribe from the one centered in Buridava. (not to be confused with the Germanic tribe called Buri)
Caucoenses or Cauci
Costoboci / Costoboces / Coertoboci also Koistobokoi and Koistobokoi Montanoi
Osi / Osii, they were a Dacian tribe  but it is also argued that it was Germanic or Celtic. It was among the enemies of the Romans in the Marcomannic Wars (166-180 AD), according to Julius Capitolinus"
Predasenses / Predavensii
Ratacenses / Rhadacenses
Saboci / Sabokoi, they were a Dacian tribe, among the enemies of the Romans in the Marcomannic Wars (166-180 AD), according to Julius Capitolinus"
Serri
Senses / Sensii
Suci
Trixae
Getae (a closely related people to the Dacians, mainly east of the Carpathian Mountains, roughly matching the Dacia Inferior Roman Province)
Britolages
Buridavenses / Burridensii (Southeast Buri), their capital was Buridava, on the southern slope of the Carpathian Mountains (although related, they were a different tribe from the one that lived in the northwest of Dacia - South of Slovakian Carpathians, in the Upper Basin of the Tisia (modern Tisza) (not to be confused with the Germanic tribe called Buri)
Carpi / Carpiani / Carpians, Carpathian Mountains name is based on this tribe
Ciaginsi / Ciagisi
Cotesii
Crobyzi / Krobyzoi / Crobidae, perhaps Getae/
Getae Proper
Aedi
Clariae
Scaugdae
Harpii
Obulenses
Ordes
Piephigi
Potulatenses
Saldenses / Saldensii
Terici / Terizi
Tyragetae / Tyrageti
Troglodytae (Getian Troglodytae)

Dacians mixed with other peoples

Daco-Celts
Anartes / Anarti (Dacianized Celtic tribe, Celtic origin tribe later assimilated by the Dacians)
Teurisci

Daco-Scythians
Napae (Dacianized Scythian tribe, Scythian origin tribe later assimilated by the Dacians, after whom the city of Napoca is possibly named

Moesians / Moesi / Mysi
Artacii / Artakioi
Aureliani
Picenses - They lived south of the Danube Iron Gates (see Map 5).
Triballi

Thracians

Certain tribes and subdivisions of tribes were named differently by ancient writers but modern research points out that these were in fact the same tribe. The name Thracians itself seems to be a Greek exonym and we have no way of knowing what the Thracians called themselves. Also certain tribes mentioned by Homer are not indeed historical.
Agrianes (it is also claimed that this tribe was Paeonian)
Apsynthii
Astae / Asti, they appear in the 2nd century BC to 1st century BC
Beni
Bessi / Biessoi, they were among the enemies of the Romans in the Marcomannic Wars (166-180 AD), according to Julius Capitolinus"
Bisaltae
Bistones
Bithyni or Bythini, migrated to Asia Minor or Anatolia
Brenae
Caeni / Kainoi
Cebrenii
Cicones (Kikones), mentioned by Homer in Odyssey
Coelaletae
Coreli / Coralli
Corpili / Corpillices
Crousi
Dersaei
Dentheletae
Derrones (it is also claimed that this tribe was Paeonian)
Digeri
Dii / Dioi
Diobesi
Dolonci
Edoni / Edones
Maduateni
Maedi
MaedoBythini, Maedi that migrated to Asia Minor or Anatolia
Melanditae
Melinophagi
Nipsaei
Odomanti / Odomantes (it is also claimed that this tribe was Paeonian)
Odrysae / Odrysians
Paeti
Pieres (They also may have been a Brygian tribe, related to the Phrygians and the Mygdones, and not a Thracian tribe)
Saii / Saioi / Saianes (Saians) - Thracian tribe that inhabited Thassos island before Phoenician and Greek colonization.
Samothraci / Samothrakoi - Thracian tribe that lived in the island of Samothrace after the Pelasgians and before the Greeks that came from Samos island.
Sapaei, close to Abdera, ruled Thrace after the Odrysians
Satrae / Satri
Scyrmiadae
Sintians
Sithones
Sycaeboae
Thyni, migrated to Asia Minor/Anatolia
Tilataei
Tralles
Tranipsae
Trausi
Treres

Thracians mixed with other peoples

Thraco-Celts 
Tricornenses / Tricornesii (Romanized Thraco-Celtic community, artificially created by the Romans, that replaced the Celtic Celegeri)

Thraco-Illyrians 
Mixed tribes of Thracians and Illyrians, Thracians and Illyrians seem to have belonged to two ethnolinguistic different branches of Indo-European peoples.
Dardani
Galabri, subtribe of the Dardani.
Thunatae, subtribe of the Dardani.

Thraco-Phrygians 
Mixed tribes of Thracians and Phrygians, however Phrygians seem to have been a people ethnolinguistically closer to the Hellenic peoples, Greeks and ancient Macedonians, and not to the Thracians.
Mygdones
Pieres (They also may have been a Brygian tribe, related to the Phrygians and the Mygdones, and not a Thracian tribe)

Possible Daco-Thracian peoples

Paeonians / Paeones
There are different views and still no agreement among scholars about the Paeonians' ethnic and linguistic kinship. Some such as Wilhelm Tomaschek and Paul Kretschmer claim that the language spoken by the Paeonians belonged to the Illyrian family, while Dimitar Dechev claims affinities with Thracian. Irwin L. Merker considers that the language spoken by the Paeonians was closely related to Greek (and ancient Macedonian if it was a distinct language from ancient Greek), a Hellenic language with "a great deal of Illyrian and Thracian influence as a result of this proximity".

Agrianes (also, Agriani and Agrii) (it is also claimed that this tribe was Thracian)
Almopians (also Almopioi)
Derrones (also Derroni) (it is also claimed that this tribe was Thracian)
Doberes
Laeaeans (also Laeaei and Laiai)
Odomantes (also Odomanti) (it is also claimed that this tribe was Thracian) 
Paeoplae
Siropaiones

Cimmerians
Cimmerians could have been a people of Thracian-Dacian origin with an Iranian overlordship, a mixture of Thracians and Iranians or a missing link and a transitional people between Indo-Iranian peoples and Thracians and Dacians.

Sources

Ancient

Modern

See also 
Dacians
Getans
Moesians
Paeonians
Thracians
List of ancient tribes in Thrace and Dacia

References

External links 

Dacian toponyms, hydronyms and tribe names
 - Source texts of ancient Greek and Roman authors.
 - Strabo's work The Geography (Geographica). Book 7, Chapters 3 and 6, are about Dacia, Thracia, Danube region (Southeastern Europe).

 
 
Lists of ancient Indo-European peoples and tribes
Thracian tribes
Thracian tribes